Kenneth "Ken" Hirst (4 June 1940 – 20 December 2008) was an English rugby union, and professional rugby league footballer who played in the 1950s and 1960s.

Background
Hirst was born in Morley, Leeds, West Riding of Yorkshire, England, and he died in Ossett, Wakefield, West Yorkshire, England.

Playing career

Championship final appearances
Ken Hirst played , i.e. number 2, scored a try in Wakefield Trinity's 21-9 victory over St. Helens in the Championship Final replay during the 1966–67 season at Station Road, Swinton on Wednesday 10 May 1967.

Challenge Cup Final appearances
Ken Hirst played , i.e. number 5, and scored a try in Wakefield Trinity's 12-6 victory over Huddersfield in the 1961–62 Challenge Cup Final during the 1961–62 season at Wembley on Saturday 12 May 1962, and played , i.e. number 2, and scored 2-tries in the 10-11 defeat by Leeds in the 1967–68 Challenge Cup "Watersplash" Final during the 1967–68 season at Wembley Stadium, London on Saturday 11 May 1968, in front of a crowd of 87,100.

Notable tour matches
Ken Hirst played , i.e. number 5, he made his début, and beat Clive Churchill to score a try within the first two minutes in Wakefield Trinity's 17-12 victory over Australia in the 1956–57 Kangaroo tour of Great Britain and France match at Belle Vue, Wakefield on Monday 10 December 1956.

Club career
Ken Hirst is the third youngest player to make his début for Wakefield Trinity aged 16 years and 6 months in 1956, second youngest player being Ernest Pollard, and the youngest player being Richard Goddard.

Outside of Rugby League
Following his retirement from rugby league, Ken and his wife Irene were the landlord and lady of The Tawny Owl Inn, Prospect Road, Ossett for twenty years. They also have 1 son, Alex, and 2 grandchildren, Evie and Sam.

References

External links
Wakefield Express > We Miss You > Ken Hirst
Wakefield Win Cup 1962
Rugby Cup Final 1968

1940 births
2008 deaths
English rugby league players
English rugby union players
Morley R.F.C. players
Publicans
Rugby league players from Leeds
Rugby league wingers
Rugby union players from Leeds
Sportspeople from Morley, West Yorkshire
Wakefield Trinity players